Claudio Cipelletti (born 1962) is an Italian film director.

Claudio Cipelletti was born in Milan, Italy, in 1962.

He graduated in Architecture at Milan University and then in film-direction at the Cinema School of Milan. He developed his professional activity both as video editor for corporate videos and as independent film-maker. His short films and documentaries have been presented in several LGBT film festivals round the world.

Since 2002 he has taught editing at the IULM University and at the Cinema and new Media School of Milan.

Filmography
 1990: Pumori '90 - 60' super8 film/BetaSP - documentary about Italian himalayan expedition - 1990
 1994: Il mondo diviso (The split world) - 12' 16 mm - Italy, 1994
 1994: Epitaffio - 30' 16 mm Italy 1994 (co-directed with Ruta, Stambrini, Brusaferri)
 1997: Tuttinpiazza - four 60' video documentaries about the Italian gay movement - Italy 1994-1997
 1997: Altre Storie (Love Affairs) - 14' 35mm - Italy 1997 (co-directed with Valerio Governi)
 1998: Nessuno Uguale (No two alike) - 56' documentary - Beta SP - Agedo and Provincia of Milan, 1998
 2008: Due volte genitori (Parents reborn) - 96' documentary - Beta SP - Agedo/European Comm. 2008

External links
 

Italian LGBT people
Italian film directors
Film people from Milan
1962 births
Living people
LGBT film directors
Italian LGBT rights activists
21st-century Italian LGBT people